Gert Wigandt Kærlin (born 24 July 1950) is a Danish long-distance runner. He competed in the men's 5000 metres at the 1972 Summer Olympics.

References

1950 births
Living people
Athletes (track and field) at the 1972 Summer Olympics
Danish male long-distance runners
Olympic athletes of Denmark
Place of birth missing (living people)